Vítor Rodrigues Saba (born 11 July 1990) is a former Brazilian professional footballer who played as an attacking midfielder and last played for Hong Kong Premier League team, Eastern SC.

Club career
Born in Sukakerta, Saba arrived in Vasco da Gama's youth team at the age of 10. In 2007, he joined Flamengo's youth team and was promoted to the professional team in 2010. Saba made his professional debut on 25 September 2010, as a first-half substitute for Juan, playing as left back in a Brazilian Série A 1–3 loss to Palmeiras at Engenhão Stadium. After loans to Brazilian state league sides Macaé, Vitória and Boavista in 2011 and 2012 proved unsuccessful, with Saba failing to make an appearance at either club, he returned to Flamengo. On 14 August 2012, Saba transferred to Italian Serie B club Brescia. During his two-season stint, Saba made 35 appearances (including 2 Coppa Italia matches) and scored 13 goals.

On 20 June 2014, Australian A-League club Western Sydney Wanderers signed Saba on a two-year contract. Saba made his first appearance for the club in the first leg of the 2014 AFC Champions League quarter-final against Chinese club Guangzhou Evergrande, with the player also appearing in the 2014 AFC Champions League Final.  In the 2014 FIFA Club World Cup, Saba scored at the 89th minute against ES Sétif of Algeria to level the scoreline 2–2. On January 26, 2015, Saba left Western Sydney Wanderers, later attributing his departure to a poor relationship with the manager, Tony Popovic.

On 2 February 2015, Saba signed with Italian second tier club F.C. Crotone on a free transfer. In June, he received an offer from his old club Botafogo. In February 2016, he switched to the Italian third tier with A.C. Siena after a stint with Greek club AEL Kalloni F.C. After a stint with Bahrani club Al-Muharraq SC, he joined Eerste Divisie (Dutch second tier) club Fortuna Sittard on a one-year deal on 27 January 2017.

On 4 July 2017, Saba returned to Asia to continue his career by signing with Hong Kong club Eastern SC. On 17 April 2018, Saba confirmed via his Instagram account that he would not return for the following season.

Vitor Saba announced his retirement from football on 26 January 2019 citing heart-related health issues.

Honours
Western Sydney Wanderers
AFC Champions League: 2014

Club statistics

1 AFC Champions League statistics are included in season ending during group stages (i.e. ACL 2014 and A-League season 2013–14 etc.)

References

External links
 Player profile @ Flamengo 
 Player profile @ Flapédia 
 

Brazilian footballers
CR Flamengo footballers
Macaé Esporte Futebol Clube players
Esporte Clube Vitória players
Boavista Sport Club players
Brescia Calcio players
Western Sydney Wanderers FC players
F.C. Crotone players
AEL Kalloni F.C. players
A.C.N. Siena 1904 players
Fortuna Sittard players
Campeonato Brasileiro Série A players
Campeonato Brasileiro Série B players
Serie B players
A-League Men players
Super League Greece players
Serie C players
Eerste Divisie players
Brazilian expatriate footballers
Expatriate footballers in Italy
Brazilian expatriate sportspeople in Italy
Expatriate soccer players in Australia
Expatriate footballers in Greece
Association football midfielders
Eastern Sports Club footballers
Expatriate footballers in Hong Kong
Footballers from Rio de Janeiro (city)
1990 births
Living people
Al-Muharraq SC players
Expatriate footballers in Bahrain